The 70th New York Film Critics Circle Awards, honoring the best in film for 2004, were announced on 13 December 2004 and presented on 9 January 2005.

Winners

Best Actor:
Paul Giamatti – Sideways
Runners-up: Jamie Foxx – Ray, Don Cheadle – Hotel Rwanda, and Clint Eastwood – Million Dollar Baby
Best Actress:
Imelda Staunton – Vera Drake
Runners-up: Kate Winslet – Eternal Sunshine of the Spotless Mind and Annette Bening – Being Julia
Best Animated Feature:
The Incredibles
Best Cinematography:
Christopher Doyle – Hero (Ying xiong)
Best Director:
Clint Eastwood – Million Dollar Baby
Runner-up: Zhang Yimou – House of Flying Daggers (Shi mian mai fu)
Best Film:
Sideways
Runners-up: Eternal Sunshine of the Spotless Mind, Million Dollar Baby, and Kinsey
Best First Film:
Joshua Marston – Maria Full of Grace
Best Foreign Language Film:
Bad Education (La mala educación) • Spain
Best Non-Fiction Film:
Fahrenheit 9/11
Runner-up: Tarnation
Best Screenplay:
Alexander Payne and Jim Taylor – Sideways
Runner-up: Charlie Kaufman – Eternal Sunshine of the Spotless Mind
Best Supporting Actor:
Clive Owen – Closer
Runner-up: Thomas Haden Church – Sideways
Best Supporting Actress:
Virginia Madsen – Sideways
Special Award:
Milestone Films

References

External links
 2004 Awards

2004
New York Film Critics Circle Awards, 2004
2004 in American cinema
New
New York